The Myasishchev M-18 was a design for a Soviet supersonic bomber with a variable-sweep wing. The project was dropped in favour of the Tupolev Tu-160 program. Although the design was the most successful when competing with the Tu-160 and Sukhoi T-4, it was dropped as Tupolev had the most potential to go ahead with the supersonic bomber project.

External links

.Picture of scale model from testpilot.ru
.Cutaway diagram from testpilot.ru

Myasishchev aircraft
1980s Soviet bomber aircraft
Abandoned military aircraft projects of the Soviet Union
Quadjets